Tajamul Islam (born in 2008, Tarkpora, Bandipora district) is an Indian kickboxer from Kaloosa, Bandipora district in Jammu and Kashmir. She won a gold medal in the U-14 World Kickboxing Championship held in Cairo, Egypt. She also achieved Young Achiever Award 2021 organised by Irfan Attari Kashmiri, the founder of Kashmir Youth Web & Foundation For Drug-free Kashmir. She clinched another gold medal in the World Kickboxing Champion For 2nd Time. Back in 2016, as an eight-year-old, Tajamul Islam won the World Kickboxing Championship and now has won it for a second time.She was promoted by Jammu and Kashmir Bank in their yearly calendar.

Medals
GOLD
2015: state-level kickboxing championship in sub-junior category, held in Jammu
2015: National Kickboxing Championship in sub-junior category, held in Delhi
2016: World Kickboxing Championship in under-8 category, held in Italy
2021: World Kickboxing Championship in under-14 category, held in Cairo, Egypt

References

Indian kickboxers
Living people
People from Bandipore district
2008 births